The 2017–18 Serie B (known as the Serie B ConTe.it for sponsorship reasons) was the 86th season since its establishment in 1929.

A total of 22 teams contested the league: 15 returning from the 2016–17 Serie B season, 4 promoted from 2016–17 Lega Pro (Cremonese, Venezia, Foggia, Parma), and 3 relegated from 2016–17 Serie A (Empoli, Palermo, Pescara).

Teams

Stadia and locations

Number of teams by regions

Personnel and kits

Managerial changes

League table

On August 13, 2018, the FIGC decided to reduce the chronic financial instability of the league halting re-elections of clubs. Serie B was so reduced to 19 clubs.

Promotion play-offs
Six teams could contest the promotion play-offs depending on the point differential between the third and fourth-placed teams. It began with a preliminary one-legged round played at the home venue of the higher placed team, involving the teams placed fifth to eight. The two winning (or higher placed team from regular season if a match ended with a draw) teams advanced to play the third and fourth-placed teams in the two-legged semi-finals. Those winning teams advanced to the two-legged final, where the winner was promoted to play in Serie A the following season. In the two-legged rounds, the higher seeded team played the second game at home.

Relegation play-out
Two teams contested the relegation play-out in a two-legged round. The higher placed team played the second leg at home. In the case of a tie on aggregate, the higher placed team from the regular season were declared the winners. The losers were relegated to Serie C for the following season.

Top goalscorers

Results

References

Serie B seasons
Italy
2017–18 in Italian football leagues